Hanyuan County is a county of Sichuan Province, China. It is under the administration of Ya'an city.
The principal town is Shirong. The Pubugou Hydropower Station in the county has caused displacement problems for thousands of villagers, and in 2004 some 20,000 villagers protested against it.

Climate

References

 
County-level divisions of Sichuan
Ya'an